The Jeton de vermeil is an award recognising scholarly achievement in numismatics. It is awarded by the  annually to a foreign (non-French) numismatic scholar, and every three years to the outgoing president of the society. It was formerly known as the Médaille de vermeil. It is a widely recognised award for numismatics.

The medal was created in 1932-36 by Lucien Bazor, engraver at the Paris Mint, thanks to a bequest to the Society from Pierre Babut (who was President of the Society, 1907-1908 and 1912–1913).

Recipients of the Médaille de vermeil 
 1934 - G.F. Hill
 1935 - 
 1936 - E.T. Newell
 1939 - H. Mattingly

Recipients of the Jeton de vermeil 

 1969 - K. Castelin
 1971 - R.A.G. Carson
 1972 - P. Balog
 1973 - H.A. Cahn
 1974 - P. Bruun
 1976 - R. Kiersnowski
 1977 - L. Villaronga  
 1978 - M.R. Alfoeldi 
 1979 - M.D. Metcalf 
 1980 - T. Hackens 
 1981 - G. Belloni 
 1982 - S. Suchodolski 
 1983 - S. Scheers 
 1984 - M. Crawford 
 1985 - R. Weiller 
 1986 -  
 1987 -  
 1988 - M. Archibald 
 1989 - A. Kunisz
 1990 - 
 1991 - M. Blackburn
 1992 - G. Demski
 1993 - H.U. Geiger
 1994 - A. Johnston
 1995 - N. Mayhew
 1996 - A. Geiser 
 1997 - A. Pol 
 1998 - P.P. Ripollès
 1999 - L. Travaini 
 2000 - S. Gjongecaj 
 2001 - W. Hahn 
 2002 - Y. Touratsoglou
 2003 - M. Crusafont i Sabater 
 2004 - A. Burnett
 2005 - U. Klein 
 2006 - F. de Callataÿ 
 2007 - A. Saccoci 
 2008 - W. Metcalf 
 2009 - Benedikt Zäch (Winterthur coin cabinet)
 2010 - M. Alram 
 2011 - E. Oberländer 
 2012 - R. Bland 
 2013 - A. Rovelli
 2014 - C. Arnold-Biucchi
 2015 - P. Ilisch 
 2016 - J. van Heesch 
 2017 - J. Chr. Moesgaard
 2018 - K. Butcher
 2019 - Helen Wang (British Museum)
 2020 - M. Michele Asolati
 2021 - B. Woytek (Österreichisches Archäologisches Institut)

References

Medals
Numismatics
Numismatic associations
Awards for numismatics